Philippe Poisson (8 February 1682 - 4 August 1743), known professionally as Crispin III, was a French actor and playwright.

Life
He, the actor François-Arnoul Poisson de Roinville and the novelist and playwright Madeleine-Angélique de Gomez were all children of the actor Paul Poisson. Born in Paris, Philippe made his début in 1700 in a tragedy, playing secondary rôles with some success and also appearing in high comedy. Retiring with his father in 1711, he returned to the stage in 1715 before leaving it for good in 1722. He died in Saint-Germain-en-Laye.

Like those of his grandfather Raymond Poisson, his plays lack invention - their style is less trivial but still lacks elegance, though their dialogue is naturalistic. The two most notable ones are le Procureur arbitre (1728) and l’Impromptu de campagne (1733), whilst the others are la Boite de Pandore (1729), Alcibiade (1731), le Réveil d’Épiménide (1736), le Mariage par lettres de change (1735), les Ruses d’amour (1736) and  l’Actrice nouvelle (a comedy, never performed after Adrienne Lecouvreur wrote a satire mocking it).

References

Sources

External links
  Philippe Poisson at the Comédie-Française official website

1682 births
1743 deaths
18th-century French dramatists and playwrights
18th-century French male actors
French male stage actors